Rose Hill is a village in Jasper County, Illinois, United States. The population was 80 at the 2010 census.

History
A post office was established at Rose Hill in 1846, and remained in operation until 1967. The village's name is an alteration of "Roe's Hill".

Geography
Rose Hill is located in northern Jasper County. Illinois Route 130 forms the eastern boundary of the village; it leads north  to Greenup and south  to Newton, the Jasper county seat.

Demographics

As of the census of 2000, there were 79 people, 36 households, and 21 families residing in the village. The racial makeup of the village was 98.73% White and 1.27% Asian.

There were 36 households, out of which 25.0% had children under the age of 18 living with them, 44.4% were married couples living together, 11.1% had a female householder with no husband present, and 38.9% were non-families. 33.3% of all households were made up of individuals, and 8.3% had someone living alone who was 65 years of age or older. The average household size was 2.19 and the average family size was 2.77.

In the village, the population was spread out, with 17.7% under the age of 18, 5.1% from 18 to 24, 27.8% from 25 to 44, 26.6% from 45 to 64, and 22.8% who were 65 years of age or older. The median age was 45 years. For every 100 females, there were 97.5 males. For every 100 females age 18 and over, there were 103.1 males.

The median income for a household in the village was $30,938, and the median income for a family was $39,167. Males had a median income of $40,000 versus $26,250 for females. The per capita income for the village was $17,510. There were no families and 2.2% of the population living below the poverty line, including no under eighteens and none of those over 64.

References

Villages in Jasper County, Illinois
Villages in Illinois